John Tomerlin (March 26, 1930 – November 25, 2014) was an American author and screenwriter.

Major works

Tomerlin's first science fiction story was Alienation of Affection, published in the magazine Science Fantasy in February 1957.  Under the joint pseudonym Keith Grantland, he wrote the novel Run From the Hunter (1957) with Charles Beaumont.  His sole science fiction novel, The High Tower, was published in 1980.

Television and film

He adapted Charles Beaumont's short story The Beautiful People as Number 12 Looks Just Like You for The Twilight Zone.  Though Tomerlin alone adapted the ailing Beaumont's story, he was given secondary credit.

Other series he wrote for include Thriller and Richard Diamond, Private Detective.

He provided the screenplay for a 1973 made-for-television version of Oscar Wilde's The Picture of Dorian Gray.

References

External links

 Tomerlin Interview
 Tomerlin's Science Fiction Bibliography

Further reading
 California Sorcery'', edited by William F. Nolan and William Schafer.

1930 births
2014 deaths
20th-century American novelists
20th-century American male writers
American fantasy writers
American male novelists
American science fiction writers
American male short story writers
20th-century American short story writers
Novelists from California